"I Like That" is a single by Canadian music producer Richard Vission and American music producer Static Revenger, starring English singer Luciana. The two producers and the singer co-wrote the song with Nick Clow.

"I Like That" was a chart success in Australia and New Zealand, peaking at number three on the Australian Singles Chart and number 19 on the New Zealand Singles Chart. It is certified double platinum in Australia. The song also found popularity in North America, topping the US Billboard Dance Club Songs chart and peaking at number 86 on the Canadian Hot 100.

Charts

Weekly charts

Year-end charts

Certifications

In popular culture
"I Like That" was featured in Step Up 3D (2010) and The Darkest Hour (2011).

See also
List of number-one dance singles of 2010 (U.S.)

References

2009 singles
Songs written by Luciana Caporaso
Songs written by Nick Clow